The 2017–18 FC Porto season was the club's 108th competitive season and the 84th consecutive season in the top flight of Portuguese football. The season began on 9 August 2017 and concluded on 12 May 2018.

Porto won the 2017–18 Primeira Liga title in the penultimate matchday following a draw between direct rivals Benfica and Sporting CP. In so doing, they secured their first league title since the 2012–13 season and first overall title since the 2013 Supertaça Cândido de Oliveira. Porto also competed in the 2017–18 Taça da Liga and the 2017–18 Taça de Portugal; in both competitions, they reached the semi-finals but were eliminated by Sporting CP after a penalty shootout.

In UEFA competitions, Porto participated for the 7th consecutive and 22nd overall time in the UEFA Champions League group stage, a record shared with Barcelona and Real Madrid. They advanced to the round of 16 as group runners-up, behind Beşiktaş, where they were eliminated by Liverpool.

Players

Squad information

Transfers and loans

In

Out

Loan in

Loan return

Loan out

End of loan

Technical staff

{| class=wikitable
|-
!Position
!Staff
|-
| Head coach ||  Sérgio Conceição
|-
| Assistant coach ||  Siramana Dembélé
|-
| Goalkeeping coach ||  Diamantino Figueiredo
|-
| Fitness coach ||  Vítor Bruno
|-
| Physiologist ||  Eduardo Oliveira
|-

Pre-season and friendlies
Porto began their pre-season on 3 July 2017. The fixture list was announced on 18 June 2017 and included a participation in a tournament in Mexico. The traditional presentation match was played on 30 July against Spanish La Liga side Deportivo de La Coruña.

Competitions

Overall record

Primeira Liga

League table

Results by round

Matches

Notes:

Taça de Portugal

Third round

Fourth round

Fifth round

Quarter-finals

Semi-finals

Taça da Liga

Third round

Semi-finals

UEFA Champions League

Group stage

Knockout phase

Round of 16

Statistics

Appearances and discipline
Numbers in parentheses denote appearances as substitute.

Goalscorers

Hat-tricks

(H) – Home; (A) – Away

Clean sheets

References

FC Porto seasons
Porto
Porto
Portuguese football championship-winning seasons